"Change of Heart" is a song by Australian rock musician, Jimmy Barnes. Released in May 1995 as the lead single from his eighth studio album, Psyclone (1995). The song peaked at number 17 on the Australian ARIA Singles Chart.

Track listing
 CD Single (D11980)
 "Change Of Heart" - 4:01	
 "Edgewood" - 2:57	
 "The Other Side" - 4:16	

 CD Maxi (DX11980)
 "Change Of Heart"	
 "Come Undone"  (Live Acoustic Version) 
 "You Can't Always Get What You Want"  (Live Acoustic Version) 
 "Many Rivers to Cross"  (Live Acoustic Version)

Charts

References

Mushroom Records singles
1995 singles
1995 songs
Jimmy Barnes songs
Songs written by Jimmy Barnes